The Nigeria women's national field hockey team represents Nigeria in women's international field hockey competitions.

Tournament history

World Cup
1978 – 11th
1981 – 10th

African Games
1995 – 5th
2003 –

Africa Cup of Nations
2005 – 4th
2009 – 
2017 – 
2022 – 5th

Commonwealth Games
2006 – 10th

African Olympic Qualifier
2007 – 4th
2015 – 6th
2019 – Withdrew

Hockey World League
2012–13 – Round 1
2016–17 – Round 1

See also
Nigeria men's national field hockey team

References

External links
FIH profile

African women's national field hockey teams
Field hockey
National team